Ponnu Veetukkaran is a 1999 Tamil language comedy drama film directed by P. Vasu. The film stars Sathyaraj and Preetha Vijayakumar, while Vijay Adhiraj, Goundamani, Vijayakumar and Radharavi play supporting roles. The film released in January 1999.

Plot
Ponnu Veetukkaran is a drama which tells the story of nice Jeeva (Sathyaraj), who is the perfect handyman and the protector of a big rich family of the Tamil Country, constituted by Gangadaran (Radha Ravi), Muralidaran (Ilavarasan), and Giridaran (Kazan Khan). These three brothers are spouses and fathers, each of several children. Traders of sarees precious, they hold one of the most beautiful and furthermore with the aim of the stores of the capital, so making their colossal fortune.

But what makes their happiness and their pride overcoat everything is Indu (Preetha Vijayakumar), the youngest child of this big welded family. Intelligent, beautiful and roguish as one pleases, she cheers up, illuminates with her presence their everyday life, as well as their cousin, the useless person, Yégambharam (Goundamani), but nevertheless very nice, always in conflict with his father Védatchalam, the dean moved by the family.

Jeeva comes from a family which was always in the service of three brothers and it since its father (Ravikumar) who was him with theirs, as driver. Far from maintaining employeur-d'employee's standard relation, the brothers' father (Rajeev) got used to fraternizing with Jeeva's father to the point that they became as brother. Jeeva frequented one time, the same schools as three brothers.

Nevertheless, a misfortune struck the family. Their respective parents were victims of a car accident. His wives were killed instantly. Whereas the fathers, in the agony, made promise to their children to part never and on no account, of Jeeva and mutually. The good mood and the know-how and the practical sense of Jeeva put everybody all right. He shares a beautiful complicity with Indu, who is sometimes badly understood outside the family circle and gives rise to gossips maintained by the fact that Jeeva remains incorrigible bachelor. In the truth, he dreads that his future wife (if he finds one) tears away him from his family of adoption and house thus only, to avoid this problem, but regrettably, this happiness is going to be again broken. Indeed, Indu loses her husband, just before their honeymoon, a few days after their marriage celebrated in formal dinners, with all the splendor. Everybody is bewildered and appalled.

Jeeva, who had just left the marriage, knows only after his return about the death of the son-in-law. Annihilated as everybody, at the beginning, Jeeva quickly gets over it, by giving for mission to find a new pretender for Indu. Nevertheless, he finds the one person in a million, in the person of Muthu (Vijay Adhiraj), an old acquaintance of Indu. Assisted by Yégambharam, Jeeva helps as best he can Muthu to conquer Indu, in spite of the secular obstacles against the widows considered as one bet in India.

Cast

Sathyaraj as Jeeva
Preetha Vijayakumar as Indu (5th among siblings)
Goundamani as Yégambharam also Charles
Vijayakumar as Indu's father-in-law
Radharavi as Gangadaran (1st brother)
Ilavarasan as Muralidaran (2nd brother)
Kazan Khan as Giridaran (3rd brother)
Meera as Indu's sister (4th among siblings)
Fathima Babu as Gangadaran's wife
Vijay Adhiraj as Muthu
K. S. Ravikumar as Manogar, Muthu's father
Ganthimathi as Old Widow
Nizhalgal Ravi as Groom
Rajiv as the brothers' father
Ravikumar as Jeeva's father
Vichithra as Diana, Yégambharam's girlfriend
Khushbu (Guest Appearance) as Jeeva's wife

Soundtrack
The music was composed by Ilaiyaraaja.

Release
The film was initially scheduled to release on 19 October 1998 to coincide with Diwali, but was delayed by three months.

References

External links

1999 films
1990s Tamil-language films
Films directed by P. Vasu
Films scored by Ilaiyaraaja